Mary Hames (14 May 1827–3 April 1919) was a New Zealand dressmaker, farmer and domestic servant. She was born in Much Marcle, Herefordshire, England on 14 May 1827.

References

1827 births
1919 deaths
New Zealand farmers
New Zealand women farmers
People from Herefordshire
Servants
19th-century New Zealand businesspeople
19th-century New Zealand businesswomen
19th-century New Zealand people
New Zealand domestic workers